John Rosamond Johnson (August 11, 1873 – November 11, 1954; usually referred to as J. Rosamond Johnson) was an American composer and singer during the Harlem Renaissance. Born in Jacksonville, Florida, he had much of his career in New York City. Johnson is noted as the composer of the tune for the hymn "Lift Every Voice and Sing”. It was first performed live by 500 Black American students from the segregated Florida Baptist Academy, Jacksonville, Florida, in 1900. The song was published by Joseph W. Stern & Co., Manhattan, New York (later the Edward B. Marks Music Company).

J. Rosamond Johnson was the younger brother of poet and activist James Weldon Johnson, who wrote the lyrics for "Lift Every Voice and Sing". The two also worked together in causes related to the NAACP.

Biography
J. Rosamond Johnson was born on August 11, 1873, the son of Helen Louise Dillet, a native of Nassau, Bahamas, and James Johnson. His maternal great-grandmother, Hester Argo, had escaped from Saint-Domingue (now Haiti) during the revolutionary upheaval in 1802, along with her three young children, including (Johnson's grandfather Stephen Dillet (1797–1880). Although originally headed to Cuba, their boat was intercepted by privateers and they were brought to Nassau, Bahamas instead. There they permanently settled. In 1833 Stephen Dillet was the first man of color to win election to the Bahamian legislature.

Johnson was trained at the New England Conservatory and then studied in London. His career began as a public school teacher in his hometown of Jacksonville, Florida. Traveling to New York, he began his show business career along with his brother and composer Bob Cole. As a songwriting team, they wrote works such as The Evolution of Ragtime (1903). Among the earliest works by the group was a suite of six songs of "Negro" music. The men also produced two successful Broadway operettas with casts of black actors: Shoo-Fly Regiment of 1906 and The Red Moon of 1908.

Johnson also performed in these operettas. He played a Tuskegee soldier who enlists in the Spanish–American War in The Shoo Fly Regiment and portrayed African-American Plunk Green opposite Abbie Mitchell’s Minnehaha, a mixed Indian/black woman, in The Red Moon.   These performances went beyond theatre. Rosamond, alongside his brother and Cole, evoked a political presence in their inclusion of other races in their musicals.  In The Red Moon, Cole and Johnson broke racial lines as they included a love scene between Rosamond’s Green and Mitchell’s Minnehaha. This spotlight on Native Americans was so well received that Rosamond was inducted as a ‘sub-chief’ into the Iroquois tribe of Montreal’s Caughnawaga Reservation, which had a majority population of ethnic Mohawk people.

Cole and the Johnson brothers also created and produced several "white" musicals: Sleeping Beauty and the Beast in 1901, In Newport in 1904, and Humpty Dumpty in 1904. Johnson would also collaborate to create Hello Paris with J. Leubrie Hill in 1911.

Johnson was active in various musical roles during his career. He toured the vaudeville circuit and, after Cole's 1911 death, began a successful tour with Charles Hart and Tom Brown. In London, he wrote music for a theater review from 1912 to 1913 serving a long residency. After returning to the United States, New York's Music School Settlement for Colored — founded by the New York Symphony Orchestra's David Mannes — appointed him as director where he served from 1914 to 1919.

J. Rosamond Johnson served as the first Deputy Marshal for the historic Negro Silent Protest Parade in 1917.

Johnson also toured with his own ensembles, The Harlem Rounders and The Inimitable Five. He also performed in Negro spiritual concerts with Emmanuel Taylor Gordon, including at Aeolian Hall in Manhattan.

Johnson created vocal arrangements for the  1933 film version of Eugene O’Neill’s play The Emperor Jones starring Paul Robeson. 

The London production of Lew Leslie's Blackbirds of 1936 engaged Johnson as musical director. During the 1930s, Johnson also sang the role of Frazier in the original production of Gershwin's Porgy and Bess, taking roles in other dramas as well. He reprised his role as Frazier on the 1951 studio recording of Porgy and Bess.

As an editor, he collected four important works of traditional African-American songs. The first two of these song collections he compiled along with his brother James: The Book of American Negro Spirituals (1925) and The Second Book of Negro Spirituals (1926). In addition, Johnson edited Shoutsongs (1936) and the folksong anthology Rolling Along in Song (1937).

He died on November 11, 1954, in New York City. His widow, Nora E. Floyd Johnson, died in 1969.

Musical works

 The Shoo-Fly Regiment (1906), Broadway operetta
 The Red Moon (1908), Broadway operetta
 The Sleeping Beauty and the Beast (1901),  musical
 "My Castle On The Nile," song (1901)
 "My heart's desiah is Miss Mariah" (1901), song
 "Mudder Knows" (1903), song
 In Newport (1904), musical
 Humpty Dumpty (1904), musical
 "I'll Keep a Warm Spot in My Heart For You" (1906), song
 Mr. Lode of Koal (1909), musical
 Come Over Here (1912), musical
 "The Maiden with the Dreamy Eyes,", song
 "Didn't He Ramble", song
 "Li'l Gal", song
 "Since You Went Away", song
 "Lift Every Voice and Sing", song
 "The Siberian Dip" (1911), ragtime instrumental

See also

The Frogs (club)
African American musical theater

Notes

References
 Southern, Eileen. The Music of Black Americans: A History. W. W. Norton & Company; 3rd edition. 
 Yenser, Thomas (editor), Who's Who in Colored America: A Biographical Dictionary of Notable Living Persons of African Descent in America, Who's Who in Colored America, Brooklyn, New York, 1930-1931-1932 (Third Edition)
 Paula Marie Seniors, Beyond Lift Every Voice and Sing: The Culture of Uplift, Identity, and Culture in Black Musical Theater

External links

The J. Rosamond Johnson Papers at Yale University Music Library

1873 births
1954 deaths
20th-century African-American people
African-American classical composers
American classical composers
African-American male classical composers
American male classical composers
American musical theatre composers
American operetta composers
American people of Bahamian descent
American people of French descent
American people of Haitian descent
Male musical theatre composers
Male operetta composers
New England Conservatory alumni
People from Jacksonville, Florida
Vaudeville performers